() is a Japanese animation studio primarily controlled by its namesake Toei Company. It has produced numerous series, including Sally the Witch, GeGeGe no Kitarō, Mazinger Z, Galaxy Express 999, Cutie Honey, Dr. Slump, Dragon Ball, Saint Seiya, Sailor Moon, Slam Dunk, Digimon, One Piece, Toriko, World Trigger, The Transformers (between 1984–1990, including several Japanese exclusive productions) and the Pretty Cure series.

History 
In 1956, Toei purchased the studio and it was renamed , doing business as Toei Animation Co., Ltd. outside Japan. In 1998, the Japanese name was renamed to Toei Animation. It has created a number of TV series and movies and adapted Japanese comics as animated series, many popular worldwide. Hayao Miyazaki, Isao Takahata, Yasuji Mori, Leiji Matsumoto and Yōichi Kotabe have worked with the company. Toei is a shareholder in the Japanese anime satellite television network Animax with other anime studios and production companies, such as Sunrise, TMS Entertainment and Nihon Ad Systems Inc. The company is headquartered in the Ohizumi Studio in Nerima, Tokyo.

Their mascot is the cat Pero, from the company's 1969 film adaptation of Puss in Boots.

Toei Animation produced anime versions of works from manga series by manga artists, including Go Nagai (Mazinger Z), Eiichiro Oda (One Piece), Shotaro Ishinomori (Cyborg 009), Mitsutoshi Shimabukuro (Toriko), Takehiko Inoue (Slam Dunk), Mitsuteru Yokoyama (Sally the Witch), Masami Kurumada (Saint Seiya), Akira Toriyama (Dragon Ball and Dr. Slump), Leiji Matsumoto (Galaxy Express 999), and Naoko Takeuchi (Sailor Moon). The studio helped propel the popularity of the Magical Girl and Super Robot genres of anime; Toei's TV series include the first magical-girl anime series, Mahoutsukai Sally (an adaptation of Mitsuteru Yokoyama's manga of the same name), and Go Nagai's Mazinger Z, an adaptation of his manga which set the standard for Super Robot anime. Although the Toei Company usually contracts Toei Animation to handle its animation internally, they occasionally hire other companies to provide animation; although the Toei Company produced the Robot Romance Trilogy, Sunrise (then known as Nippon Sunrise) provided the animation. Toei Company would also enlist the help of other studios such as hiring Academy Productions to produce the animation for Space Emperor God Sigma, rather than use their own studio.

Toei Animation's anime which have won the Animage Anime Grand Prix award are Galaxy Express 999 in 1981, Saint Seiya in 1987 and Sailor Moon in 1992. In addition to producing anime for release in Japan, Toei Animation began providing animation for American films and television series during the 1960s and particularly during the 1980s.

In October 2021, Toei Animation announced that they had signed a strategic partnership with the South Korean entertainment conglomerate CJ ENM.

2022 ransomware attack 
On March 6, 2022, an incident occurred in which an unauthorized third party attempted to hack Toei Animation's network, which resulted in the company's online store and internal systems becoming temporarily suspended. The company investigated the incident and stated that the hack would affect the broadcast schedules of several anime series, including One Piece. In addition, Dragon Ball Super: Super Hero was also rescheduled to June 11, 2022 due to the hack. On April 6, 2022, Toei Animation announced that it would resume broadcasting the anime series, including One Piece. The following day, the Japanese public broadcaster NHK reported that the hack was caused by a targeted ransomware attack.

Subsidiaries

Currently in production

TV animation

1960–69

1970–79

1980–89

1990–99

2000–09

2010–19

2020–present

Television films and specials

Theatrical films

CGI films

Original video animation (OVA) and original net animation (ONA)

Video game animation

Video game development

Dubbing 
Animated productions by foreign studios dubbed in Japanese by Toei are The Mystery of the Third Planet (1981 Russian film, dubbed in 2008); Les Maîtres du temps (1982 French-Hungarian film, dubbed in 2014), Alice's Birthday (2009 Russian film, dubbed in 2013) and Becca's Bunch (2018 television series, dubbed in 2021 to 2022).

Commission work 
Toei has been commissioned to provide animation by Japanese and American studios such as Sunbow Entertainment, Marvel Productions, Hanna-Barbera, DIC Entertainment, Rankin/Bass Productions and World Events Productions (DreamWorks Animation). In the 60's, they primarily worked with Rankin/Bass, but beginning in the 80's, they worked with Marvel Productions and their list of clients grew, until the end of the decade. Toei didn't provide much outsourced animation work in the 90's and since the 2000's has only rarely worked with other companies outside Japan.

Controversies

Fair use disputes 
Between 2008 and 2018, Toei Animation had copyright claimed TeamFourStar's parody series, DragonBall Z Abridged. TFS stated that the parody series is protected under fair use.

On December 7, 2021, Toei Animation copyright claimed over 150 videos by YouTuber Totally Not Mark, real name Mark Fitzpatrick. He uploaded a video addressing the issue, claiming that they were protected under fair use, and that nine of the videos do not include any Toei footage. He also outlined the appeal process on YouTube, and estimated having the videos reinstated could take over 37 years. He then goes on to announce that he would not be supporting new Toei releases until the issue had been resolved, and also called for a boycott on the upcoming Dragon Ball Super: Super Hero film. The dispute sparked discussion on YouTube on the vulnerability of creators against the copyright system and lack of fair use laws in Japan, with YouTubers such as PewDiePie and The Anime Man speaking out on the issue.

On January 26, 2022, Fitzpatrick had his videos reinstated after negotiations with YouTube.

Treatment of employees 
On January 20, 2021, two employees have accused Toei Animation of overworking their employees and discrimination towards sexual minorities. The company had inappropriately referred to employees who identifies as X-gender (a non-binary identity in Japan).

See also 
 SynergySP, Studio Junio and Hal Film Maker/Yumeta Company, animation studios founded by former Toei animators.
 Topcraft, an animation studio founded by former Toei Animation producer Toru Hara.
 Studio Ghibli, an animation studio founded by former Toei animators Hayao Miyazaki and Isao Takahata.
 Mushi Production, an animation studio founded by Osamu Tezuka and former Toei animators.
 Shin-Ei Animation, formally A Production, an animation studio founded by former Toei animator Daikichirō Kusube.
 Yamamura Animation, an animation studio founded by former Toei animator Kōji Yamamura.
 Doga Kobo, an animation studio formed by former Toei animators Hideo Furusawa and Megumu Ishiguro.

References

External links 

  
 Toei Animation Inc. Official website
 Toei Animation Europe Official website
 
 Toei Animation at IMDb
 co-productions database

 
Animation studios in Tokyo
Japanese animation studios
Mass media companies established in 1956
Animax
TV Asahi
Japanese companies established in 1956
2000 initial public offerings
Companies listed on the Tokyo Stock Exchange